The Ustyurt or Ust-Yurt (from ; ; ;  — flat hill, plateau) is a transboundary clay desert shared by Turkmenistan, Uzbekistan and Kazakhstan.

The plateau's semi-nomadic population raises sheep, goats, and camels.

Geography
The Ustyurt is located between the Dead Kultuk, Mangyshlak Peninsula and Kara-Bogaz-Gol of the Caspian Sea to the west, and the Aral Sea, Amudarya Delta and Sarygamysh Lake to the east.

At its northeastern edge it drops steeply to the Aral Sea and the surrounding plain.

Protected areas
Kazakhstan created the Ustyurt Nature Reserve (223,300 hectares) in July, 1984 in the south of Mangystausky district in Eralievsky region.  It preserves rare fauna and flora such as the Ustyurt Mountain sheep and the Saiga antelope. Among its features are Sherkala Mountain and the concretions found in the Torysh ('Valley of Balls') near the town of Shetpe.

See also
 Emba River
 Transcaspian Region
 Karakalpaks
 Khwarezm oasis region

References

External links 

 Hundreds of desert kites in the Ustyurt. Nat. Geographic

Plateaus of Kazakhstan
Landforms of Uzbekistan
Plateaus of Asia